Pellejas may refer to:

Places
Pellejas, Adjuntas, Puerto Rico, a barrio
Pellejas, Orocovis, Puerto Rico, a barrio